Ulceby is a village in the East Lindsey district of Lincolnshire in England.

External links

Villages in Lincolnshire
East Lindsey District